Olli Ojanaho (born February 25, 1997) is a Finnish orienteering competitor. He was born in Rovaniemi and started his youth career representing the club Ounasvaaran Hiihtoseura. As of 2017 Ojanaho lives in Helsinki and represents Helsingin Suunnistajat.

Junior career
Ojanaho made his debut at the Junior World Orienteering Championships (JWOC) in 2014 in Borovets, Bulgaria. At the age of 17, three years younger than his oldest competitors, he won a bronze medal at the middle distance. The following year, at the 2015 JWOC in Rauland, Norway, he won three gold medals after winning all three forest races: the long distance, the middle distance and the relay.

At the 2017 JWOC on home soil in Tampere, Ojanaho won all three individual races: the two individual forest races and the sprint. This feat was matched the same year by Swiss runner Simona Aebersold.

He is the most decorated male orienteer ever at the junior level after having won six gold, one silver and two bronze medals at the JWOC.

Senior career
Ojanaho debuted at the senior championship level in 2017 when he represented Finland at the 2017 World Orienteering Championships (WOC) in Tartu, Estonia. The senior WOC was scheduled just one week ahead of the JWOC as doubling of the events and hence a conflicting programme for the athletes is normally not an issue. Ojanaho finished 27th in the middle distance.

World Championship results

References

External links
 

1997 births
Living people
Finnish orienteers
Male orienteers
Foot orienteers
People from Rovaniemi
Sportspeople from Lapland (Finland)
Junior World Orienteering Championships medalists